The Japanese missions to Imperial China were diplomatic embassies which were intermittently sent to the Chinese imperial court. Any distinction amongst diplomatic envoys sent from the Japanese court or from any of the Japanese shogunates was lost or rendered moot when the ambassador was received in the Chinese capital.

Extant records document missions to China between the years of 607 and 839 (a mission planned for 894 was cancelled). The composition of these imperial missions included members of the aristocratic kuge and  Buddhist monks. These missions led to the importation of Chinese culture, including advances in the sciences and technology. These diplomatic encounters produced the beginnings of a range of schools of Buddhism in Japan, including Zen.

From the Sinocentric perspective of the Chinese court in Chang'an, the several embassies sent from Kyoto were construed as tributaries of Imperial China; but it is not clear that the Japanese shared this view.

China seems to have taken the initiative in opening relations with Japan. The Emperor Yang of Sui dispatched a message in 605 which read:

The sovereign of Sui respectfully inquires about the sovereign of Wa.

The court of Empress Suiko responded by sponsoring a mission led by Ono no Imoko in 607. A message carried by that mission, believed to have been written by Prince Shōtoku, contains the earliest known written instance in which the Japanese archipelago is referred to by a term meaning "land of the rising sun." The salutation read, in part:

From the sovereign of the land of the rising sun (hi izuru tokoro) to the sovereign of the land of the setting sun."

The  included representatives sent to study government and technology.

The  are the best known; 19 missions were completed. A 20th mission had been planned for 894 (Kanpyō 6, 8th month), including the appointment of ambassadors. However, shortly before departure, the mission was halted by Emperor Uda because of reports of unsettled conditions in China. The emperor's decision-making was influenced by the persuasive counsel of Sugawara no Michizane.

Envoys to the Sui court

Japanese envoys to the Sui court were received as ambassadors:

607: The first diplomatic mission was led by Japan's first ambassador to China. This Japanese envoy, Ono no Imoko, had the title kenzuishi. The delegation was received in the Imperial Court.
608: Ono no Imoko leads a returning embassy to China. This mission included two others with the title kenzushi: Takamuko no Kuromaro (no Genri) and Minabuchi no Shōan. Kuromaro and Shōan, along with the Buddhist monk Sōmin  remained in China for 32 years before returning to Japan.

Envoys to the Tang court

Japanese envoys to the Tang court were received as ambassadors:
Three missions to the Tang court were dispatched during the reign of Emperor Kōtoku.
The ambassadors returned in the middle of 805 (Enryaku 24, 6th month). They were accompanied by the monk Saichō, also known by his posthumous name , whose teachings would develop into the Tendai school of Japanese Buddhism.

New ambassadors to China were appointed by Emperor Ninmyō in 834, but the mission was put off.  
836–839: The mission was postponed by a typhoon; but the ambassadors did eventually travel to the Tang court, returning in 839 with a letter from Emperor Tang Wenzong.

In China, a steady and conservative Confucianist Song dynasty emerged after the end of the Tang dynasty and subsequent period of disunity during the Five Dynasties and Ten Kingdoms period. During this time, although travel to China was generally safe, Japanese rulers believed there was little to learn from the Song, and so there were no major embassy missions to China.

Adopting Tang models
Ancient Japan was called Wa, which had a primitive culture when compared to Tang culture. The Tang folks referred to Wa as 東夷 (Eastern barbarians).

From 630 onward, Wa sent large groups of monks, students and government officials, up to 600 each time, to the Tang capital of Chang'an to learn the then advanced production technology, social system, history, philosophy, arts and architecture.
Among many items adopted by Wa:

Tang political system
Heian-kyō, the new Japanese capital established in 794, and was a laid out in a grid similar to that of Chang'an, the Tang capital.
Culture, many Han Chinese characters (漢字) were borrowed from Tang civilization to build the Japanese culture.
Tang dress codes (known today as Wafuku 和服), eating habits were the fashion which was imitated and popularized.

Envoys to the Ming court

Japanese envoys to the Ming court were received as ambassadors.

1373-1406 (Ōan 6 – Ōei 13): Embassies between China and Japan.
1397 (Ōei 4, 8th month): an Imperial ambassador is dispatched from Emperor Go-Komatsu to the Ming Court.
1401 (Ōei 8): Ashikaga Yoshimitsu sends a diplomatic mission to China as a tentative first step in re-initiating trade between Japan and Ming China. The formal diplomatic letter conveyed to the Emperor of China was accompanied by a gift of 1000 ounces of gold and diverse objects.
1402 (Ōei 9): A letter from the Jianwen Emperor of China was received by Yoshimitsu; and this formal communication mistakenly accords the title "king of Japan" to the Japanese shōgun.

Envoys to the Qing court

During Japan's self-imposed isolation in the Edo period (1603–1868), Japan's vicarious relationships with China evolved through the intermediary of the Kingdom of Ryukyu. Japan's view of external relations was ambivalent.

1853 (Kaei 6): Hayashi Akira completed Tsūkō ichiran. The work was created under orders from the bakufu to compile and edit documents pertaining to East Asian trade and diplomacy; and, for example, it includes a detailed description of a Ryukyuan tribute embassy to the Qing Chinese court in Beijing.

See also
History of China
History of Japan
Iki no Hakatoko no Sho, 7th-century text
Little China (ideology)
Chinese influence on Japanese culture
Japanese missions to Joseon

Notes

References
 Ackroyd, Joyce. (1982) Lessons from History: The Tokushi Yoron. Brisbane: University of Queensland Press. 
 Goodrich, Luther Carrington and Zhaoying Fang. (1976). Dictionary of Ming biography, 1368-1644 (明代名人傳), Vol. I; Dictionary of Ming biography, 1368-1644 (明代名人傳), Vol. II.  New York: Columbia University Press. ; ;  OCLC 1622199
 Kitagawa, Hiroshi and Bruce T. Tsuchida. (1977).  The Tale of the Heike. Tokyo: University of Tokyo Press. ; 
Mizuno, Norihito. (2003). China in Tokugawa Foreign Relations: The Tokugawa Bakufu’s Perception of and Attitudes toward Ming-Qing China, p. 109. excerpt from Japan and Its East Asian Neighbors: Japan's Perceptionf of China and Korea and the Making of Foreign Policy from the Seventeenth to the Nineteenth Century, Ph.D. dissertation, Ohio State University, 2004, as cited in Tsutsui, William M. (2009). A Companion to Japanese History, p. 83.
 Nussbaum, Louis Frédéric and Käthe Roth. (2005). Japan Encyclopedia. Cambridge: Harvard University Press. ; OCLC 48943301
 Ponsonby-Fane, Richard Arthur Brabazon. (1959). The Imperial House of Japan. Kyoto: Ponsonby Memorial Society. OCLC 194887
 Titsingh, Isaac. (1834). Nihon Odai Ichiran; ou, Annales des empereurs du Japon. Paris: Royal Asiatic Society, Oriental Translation Fund of Great Britain and Ireland.  OCLC 5850691
 Varley, H. Paul. (1973). Japanese Culture: A Short History. New York: Praeger Publishers.  OCLC 590531
 Varley, H. Paul. (1980). Jinnō Shōtōki: A Chronicle of Gods and Sovereigns. New York: Columbia University Press. ;  OCLC 59145842
 Yoda, Yoshiie. (1996). The Foundations of Japan's Modernization: a comparison with China's Path towards Modernization. Leiden: Brill. ;  OCLC 246732011

External links
中日交渉史料目録

Ancient international relations
China–Japan relations
Diplomacy
Foreign relations of Imperial China
History of the foreign relations of Japan